Clinton Community College (CCC) is a public community college in Plattsburgh, in Clinton County, New York. It is part of the State University of New York (SUNY). CCC is a residential campus that has 1,376 undergraduates with an average class size of 16. Located on Lake Champlain, it is an hour south of Montreal, Quebec and across the lake from Burlington, Vermont.

Clinton Community College offers fifteen A.A., A.S., and A.A.S. programs and ten certificate programs, all approved by the New York State Department of Education, as well as a number of articulation agreements and transfer options to other four-year colleges and universities.

Since 2009, students have also had the option to further their educations and earn a four-year Bachelor of Science (B.S.) in Human Services from Cazenovia College, on the grounds of CCC at night.

History

Clinton Community College, a member unit of the State University of New York, is situated at Bluff Point, approximately 4 miles south of the City of Plattsburgh, on forested heights overlooking Lake Champlain.

Buildings
The George Moore Academic and Administrative Building, which is the largest facility on campus, has multimedia smart classrooms, and computer labs. The William B. Forrence Health, Physical Education, and Recreation Building is the home of Cougar Athletics. The college belongs to the NJCAA and has teams for men's and women's soccer, basketball, softball and baseball. The newest building is the Stafford Center for Art, Science and Technology. The PARC Place residential complex has residence halls and a dining facility.

Extracurricular activities
Clinton Community College offers student leadership opportunities in the residence halls and on campus, as well as a number of clubs and organizations. A student can choose to join Student Senate, Student Activities Board, College Chorale, Criminal Justice Club, Drama Club, Art Club, Clinton Community Equality Alliance, Science and Technology Club, Nursing Club,  Native American Club, Honor Society (Phi Theta Kappa), and the International Student Club.

References

External links

SUNY community colleges
Education in Clinton County, New York
NJCAA athletics